Jakub Krzysztof Jasiński of Rawicz Clan (24 July 1761, in Węglew near Pyzdry in Greater Poland – 4 November 1794, in Warsaw, Poland) was a Polish general, and poet of Enlightenment. He participated in the War in Defence of the Constitution in 1792, was an enemy of the Targowica Confederation and organized an action against its supporters in Vilnius. He participated also in the Kościuszko Uprising, during the course of which he was killed in the Battle of Praga in 1794.

A graduate of the Warsaw-based Szkoła Rycerska, with time he became the tutor of engineering at his alma mater. He fought with distinction in the War in Defense of the Constitution of 1792. After the king joined the Targowica Confederation he remained loyal to the new authorities. In 1789 he became the commanding officer of the Engineering Corps for Lithuania.

War in Defence of the Constitution

He participated in the Battle of Brześć in July 1792, for which he was awarded the military award Virtuti Militari.

Despite his antipathy towards the Confederation of Targowica, opposed the Constitution of 3 May which Jasiński had defended, during this time he pledged his loyalty to it, not giving up conspiratorial activities against it.

The war of liberation
During the Kościuszko Uprising of 1794 Jasiński was among the most prominent members of the radical wing of the Polish Jacobins and at the same time a successful military commander of partisan forces in the area of the Grand Duchy of Lithuania. In April of that year he liberated the city of Vilnius by leading a successful uprising there. Supported by Tadeusz Kościuszko and appointed the commander in chief of all the partisan forces in the former Grand Duchy, he managed to defeat numerous Russian garrisons in the area. However, accusations of radical republicanism brought him into conflict with the state authorities, and by the beginning of June he was forced to resign as commander-in-chief of Lithuanian forces and pass his office to General Michał Wielhorski. Jakub Jasiński continued to harass enemy forces in Lithuania and then withdrew with a small partisan troop towards Warsaw. There he perished in November during the defense of Warsaw against the forces of Alexander Suvorov.

Among his literary works are numerous poems of satirical and fabled character, under huge influence of Voltaire, for example Jasiński's better-known "Sprzeczki" (Quarrels). He was also an author of many patriotic and revolutionary poems and songs against injustices, inspired by the French Revolution, and arousing hope of a similar one in his homeland.

Commemoration

In Poland, there are or were a number of streets named after Jakub Jasiński, including in Warsaw, Chorzów, Częstochowa, Gliwice, Inowrocław, Kraków, Lublin, Łódź, Przemyśl, Radom, Świdnica, and Zielona Góra.

Outside Poland, he is also commemorated in the names of Streets in Belarus, where there is a street named after him in Maladzyechna as well in Lithuania, where he has a street both in the Old Town of Vilnius and in Kaunas. Belarus also released a stamp with his image in 1994.

References

18th-century Polish–Lithuanian poets
Generals of the Polish–Lithuanian Commonwealth
Generals of the Kościuszko Uprising
Polish Jacobins
People of the Polish–Russian War of 1792
1761 births
1794 deaths
People from Września County
Polish generals
18th-century Polish nobility
Clan of Rawicz
Polish male poets
18th-century Polish–Lithuanian military personnel